Laurence Schwab (1893 - May 29, 1951) was an American theater and film producer, writer, and director. He was born in Boston and attended Harvard University. His first success was as co-producer of The Gingham Girl (1922).
He co-authored and produced numerous productions in the 1920s and 1930s. Several of his works were adapted to film.

Theater
WriterQueen High (1926), adapted from Edward Peple's 1914 farceGood News (1927)The New Moon (1927), co-wroteFollow Thru (1930), co-wroteTake a Chance (1932), co-wrote

ProducerAmerica's Sweetheart (1931)

Filmography

WriterFollow Thru (1930), adaptation of his play, he also producedGood News based on musical he co-wroteQueen High (1930), adaptatiom of his playI Won't Play (1944)Good News adapted from a play he co-wroteThe Desert Song adapted from a play he co-wrote

DirectingTake a Chance'', co-directed

References

1893 births
1951 deaths
American dramatists and playwrights
American film producers
American theatre managers and producers
Writers from Boston
Harvard University alumni
20th-century American screenwriters